Inside Europe: Ten Years of Turmoil is a three-part documentary broadcast on BBC Two in early 2019. It covers matters affecting the European Union in the 2010s, and in particular Brexit, the European debt crisis and the European migrant crisis.

Participants
The documentary includes interviews with Donald Tusk, Jean-Claude Juncker, Matteo Renzi, Nicolas Sarkozy, Francois Hollande, Wolfgang Schäuble, George Osborne and Yanis Varoufakis.

Episodes

Reception
The series was well received by critics, being praised for its quality and depth amongst other things.

Notes

See also
 Fire at Sea
 It Will Be Chaos
 Human Flow
 Sea Sorrow

References

External links

2019 British television series debuts
2019 British television series endings
2010s British documentary television series
BBC high definition shows
English-language television shows
Brexit
BBC television documentaries about history during the 21st Century